Don't Get Any on You is a live album by New York City noise rock band Live Skull, released in 1987 by Homestead Records.

Track listing

Personnel 
Adapted from the Don't Get Any on You liner notes.

Live Skull
 Mark C. – guitar, vocals
 Marnie Greenholz – bass guitar, vocals
 James Lo – drums
 Tom Paine – guitar, vocals

Production and additional personnel
 Martin Bisi – mixing
 Judy Mareiniss – engineering, recording
 Keri Pickett – photography

Release history

References

External links 
 

1987 live albums
Homestead Records albums
Live Skull albums